Maninghen-Henne is a commune in the Pas-de-Calais department in the Hauts-de-France region of France.

Geography

Population

Places of interest
 The church of St.Martin, dating from the nineteenth century.
 A windmill.
 Two 17th century farmhouses.

See also
Communes of the Pas-de-Calais department

References

Maninghenhenne